The 2018 AIBA Women's World Boxing Championships was held at KD Jadav Indoor Stadium at New Delhi, India and took place between 15 and 24 November 2018.

In the finals of the light flyweight category Mary Kom of India beat Ukrainian boxer Hana Okhota to win the gold, creating history by becoming the first woman boxer to win six gold medals in the AIBA World Boxing Championships.

Medal summary

Medal table

Medalists

Controversy
Despite the Kosovo Boxing Federation being a full member of the AIBA, Indian authorities refused to grant visas to competitors from Kosovo, thus preventing them from participating in the event. Athletes from Kosovo were previously denied entry to India in 2017 for the Youth Women's World Championships.

References

External links
Tournament Details and Results

 
2018
International boxing competitions hosted by India
Sport in New Delhi
Aiba
Aiba
AIBA Women's World Boxing Championships